Léré is a town in Chad and the capital of the Lac Léré department of the Mayo-Kebbi Ouest region. In 2009, the population of Léré was 89,237, 42,987 of which were male and 46,250 were female.

The town is served by Léré Airport.

References

Mayo-Kebbi Ouest Region
Populated places in Chad